The 1st constituency of Haute-Vienne (French: Première circonscription de la Haute-Vienne) is a French legislative constituency in the Haute-Vienne département. Like the other 576 French constituencies, it elects one MP using a two round electoral system.

Description

The 1st Constituency of Haute-Vienne covers the south east portion of the Department and includes most of the city of Limoges. Historically the constituency has broadly followed national trends in terms of representation. The 2017 election was notable for a strong performance by La France Insoumise and the absence of either mainstream right or left parties in the run off. Since 1988 no deputy has held the seat for two consecutive terms.

Assembly Members

Election results

2022

2017

 
 
 
 
 
 
 
|-
| colspan="8" bgcolor="#E9E9E9"|
|-

2012

 
 
 
 
 
|-
| colspan="8" bgcolor="#E9E9E9"|
|-

2007

 
 
 
 
 
 
 
|-
| colspan="8" bgcolor="#E9E9E9"|
|-

2002

 
 
 
 
 
 
 
 
|-
| colspan="8" bgcolor="#E9E9E9"|
|-

1997

 
 
 
 
 
 
 
|-
| colspan="8" bgcolor="#E9E9E9"|
|-

References

1